Godrej Interio is an Indian furniture company, headquartered in Mumbai, India. The company began manufacturing furniture in 1923 with the Godrej Storewel cupboard. It is a furniture arm of Godrej & Boyce and a part of the diversified Godrej Group. It is a brand in both the home and institutional sectors, with a market share of 15 percent.
Godrej Interio has more than 56 showrooms in 20 cities in India and 800 dealer outlets across India. It has manufacturing facilities in Mumbai, Khalapur and Shirwal in Maharashtra and  Haridwar and Bhagwanpur in Uttarakhand, with the central warehouse located at Mumbai, India.

History 
The company started manufacturing furniture in 1923, with the Godrej Storewel cupboard. In the year 2006, Godrej Interio was established as a business unit of Godrej & Boyce, part of Godrej Group.

In October 2015, Godrej Interio launched U&US Home Design Studio to expand its customized branded furniture business. U&Us is the first Indian brand to have its specialised retail store format. It offers solutions for designing and building home interiors. In January 2020, the company entered the E-commerce space after launching an eCommerce website of Godrej Interio.

See also 

 Godrej Group
 Godrej & Boyce
 Godrej Consumer Products

References 

Godrej Group
Furniture companies of India
Indian brands
Furniture retailers of India
Companies based in Mumbai
Indian companies established in 1923
Manufacturing companies established in 1923